The African Journal of Economic Policy is an academic journal covering economic policy in Africa. It is an offshoot of the Trade Policy Research and Training Programme in the Economics Department at the University of Ibadan.

External links 
 

Economics journals
Open access journals
Biannual journals
English-language journals
Publications established in 1994